Dhamur Khas is a village in Khutahan, Jaunpur district, Varanasi division, Uttar Pradesh, India.

References

Villages in Jaunpur district